The Ouachita National Forest is a vast congressionally-designated National Forest that lies in the western portion of Arkansas and portions of extreme-eastern Oklahoma, USA.

History
The Ouachita National Forest is the oldest National Forest in the southern United States. The forest encompasses , including most of the scenic Ouachita Mountain Range. Six locations in the forest, comprising , have been congressionally-designated as wilderness areas.

Ouachita is the French spelling of the Indian word Washita, which means "good hunting grounds". The forest was known as Arkansas National Forest on its establishment on December 18, 1907; the name was changed to Ouachita National Forest on April 29, 1926.

Rich in history, the rugged and scenic Ouachita Mountains were explored by Europeans in 1541 by Hernando de Soto's party of Spaniards. French explorers followed, flavoring the region with names like Fourche La Fave River.

The area including the forest nearly became a  national park during the 1920s, but a last-minute pocket veto by President Calvin Coolidge ended the effort. The bill had been pushed by U.S. Senator Joseph T. Robinson and U.S. Representative Otis Wingo, both Democrats, and State Representative Osro Cobb, then the only Republican in the Arkansas legislature. Cobb had been invited to meet with Coolidge before the proposal was killed because of opposition from the National Park Service and the United States Department of Agriculture, presumably because of the nearby location of Hot Springs National Park.

In a magazine article, Cobb described the area that he had sought to protect for future generations, located approximately midway between Little Rock and Shreveport, Louisiana, as within relatively easy driving distance of 45 million Americans, many of whom could not afford long trips to the national parks in the western states. He compared flora and fauna in the Ouachita forest to those of the southern Alleghenies, a division of the Appalachian Mountains. Cobb continued:

A visitor standing upon one of the many majestic peaks in the area of the proposed park is thrilled by a panoramic view that cannot be had elsewhere in the South Central States. With cheeks flushed by the invigorating mountain breezes, the mountain climber is rewarded by an inspiring view of countless and nameless peaks, mountain groups, dense forests, and inviting valleys, all merging into the distant horizon. ... there are many mountain streams, now moving slowly in narrow but deep pools, then churning with savage ferocity down some water-worn precipice, leaving in its wake snow-white sprays ... Fed by crystal springs and like so much molten silver these streams flow their turbulent courses unappreciated and rarely visited. ...

Features
There are also old-growth woodlands of Eastern Redcedar, Gum Bumelia, Winged Elm, and Yaupon along some streams. These vast unbroken reserves of old-growth forest make up the largest virgin forest in the United States, barring only the vast timber reserves in Alaska's Tongass Forest.

The Talimena Scenic Drive, which is Highway 1 in Oklahoma and Highway 88 in Arkansas, is a National Scenic Byway which meanders through the forest providing amazing vistas and excellent photo opportunities. The Scenic Drive passes through old-growth oak woodlands on Winding Stair and Rich Mountains.

Forest headquarters are located in Hot Springs, Arkansas.

Recreation
The forest contains a number of hiking, mountain biking and horseback riding trails. This is a well-maintained backpacking, hiking trail with overnight shelters in several portions of the trail. Mountain biking is also allowed for some sections of the trail.

Camp Clearfork was originally constructed by the Civilian Conservation Corps (CCC). Reservations are required for camping and may be made through the Womble USDA Office. The campground has six dorm/cabins which can hold up to 10 people each, three staff cabins that hold five to six people each, a dining hall, a recreation hall and accessible flush toilets and showers.

In the Oklahoma section of the forest, the  Winding Stair Mountain National Recreation Area and six other designated areas offer visitors a full range of activities with more than 150 campsites, a  lake and an equestrian camp.

Southeast of Idabel, the Oklahoma Department of Wildlife Conservation manages the Red Slough Wildlife Management Area, a  wetland area donated to the USFS by The Conservation Fund in the late 1990s and early 2000s. Hunting (no lead shot) and fishing are allowed there. The area is also a destination for birdwatchers.

Canoeing and fishing are popular activities on the Mountain Fork River, Caddo River, Little Missouri River and Ouachita River within the bounds of the forest. The Cossatot River, said to be the most difficult whitewater river between the Smoky and Rocky Mountains, also passes through the forest.

Rockhounds frequent a geologic belt several miles wide containing high concentrations of very pure quartz crystals. Visitors and rock collectors are free to pick up loose crystals within the belt for personal use and may dig for quartz with the permission of the district ranger.

Wilderness areas 
A network of wilderness areas are found in the national forest, protecting the sections of the forest that have had the least amount of human intervention. These areas harbor some of the most rugged, scenic and secluded places in all of Arkansas and the South.

The  Black Fork Mountain Wilderness is located in both Arkansas and Oklahoma and contains significant old-growth forests. It protects beautiful, rugged vistas and clear mountain springs.

The  Upper Kiamichi River Wilderness is located solely in Oklahoma.

The 14,290-acre (57.8 km2) Caney Creek Wilderness is located in the southwestern part of the forest in Arkansas. It is known for its rare Appalachian mixed mesophytic forest biome and high levels of biodiversity, as well as rare reserves of moist-hardwood old growth forest.

The 11,141-acre (45.1 km2) Poteau Mountain Wilderness is located in the north-central range of the Ouachita mountains in Arkansas.

The 6,301-acre (25.5 km2) Dry Creek Wilderness is located in the north-central ranges of the Ouachita Mountains near Magazine Mountain. It is the state's second-smallest wilderness is known for scenic overlooks and high, secluded sandstone bluffs.

The 10,181-acre (41.2 km2) Flatside Wilderness is located in the extreme-eastern segment of the Ouachita National Forest, near Lake Maumelle and Little Rock. This rarely-visited wilderness has some of the highest and most panoramic views in Arkansas and winding, tumbling clear mountain streams and waterfalls.

Counties
Ouachita National Forest is located in 13 counties in western and central Arkansas and two counties in southeastern Oklahoma. They are listed here in descending order of forestland within the county. Also given is their area as of 30 September 2007. Roughly 80% of the forest's area is in Arkansas, with the remaining 20% in Oklahoma. In Arkansas, there are local ranger district offices located in Booneville, Danville, Glenwood, Jessieville, Mena, Mount Ida, Oden, Perryville and Waldron. In Oklahoma, they are located in Hodgen, Talihina and north of Broken Bow. Even though the Ouachita National Forest is far from being the largest, its twelve ranger districts are the most of any in the National Forest system. The giant Tongass National Forest in Alaska is second with nine ranger district divisions.

 Scott County, Arkansas 
 Montgomery County, Arkansas 
 Le Flore County, Oklahoma 
 Polk County, Arkansas 
 Yell County, Arkansas 
 McCurtain County, Oklahoma 
 Garland County, Arkansas 
 Perry County, Arkansas 
 Saline County, Arkansas 
 Sebastian County, Arkansas 
 Logan County, Arkansas 
 Pike County, Arkansas 
 Ashley County, Arkansas 
 Howard County, Arkansas 
 Hot Spring County, Arkansas

Points of interest 
 Beavers Bend Resort Park
 Beech Creek National Scenic Area
 Broken Bow Lake
 Kerr Arboretum and Botanical Area
 Ouachita National Recreation Trail
 Winding Stair Mountain National Recreation Area
  Eagle Rock Loop

See also
Beech Creek National Scenic Area
Crossett Experimental Forest
Ozark Mountain forests
Talimena Scenic Drive

References

External links 

  Friends of the Ouachita Trail (FoOT)
 Ouachita National Forest, USDA Forest Service

 
National Forests of Arkansas
National Forests of Oklahoma
National Forests of the U.S. Interior Highlands

Arkansas placenames of Native American origin
Protected areas of Scott County, Arkansas
Protected areas of Montgomery County, Arkansas
Protected areas of Le Flore County, Oklahoma
Protected areas of Polk County, Arkansas
Protected areas of Yell County, Arkansas
Protected areas of McCurtain County, Oklahoma
Protected areas of Garland County, Arkansas
Protected areas of Perry County, Arkansas
Protected areas of Saline County, Arkansas
Protected areas of Sebastian County, Arkansas
Protected areas of Logan County, Arkansas
Protected areas of Pike County, Arkansas
Protected areas of Ashley County, Arkansas
Protected areas of Howard County, Arkansas
Protected areas of Hot Spring County, Arkansas
Protected areas established in 1907
1907 establishments in Arkansas
U.S. Interior Highlands
1907 establishments in Oklahoma